Mitton is a surname. Notable people with the surname include:

Bernard Mitton (1954–2017), South African tennis player
David Mitton (1939–2008), British television producer and director
Geraldine Mitton (1868–1955), English novelist, biographer, editor, and guide-book writer
Grant Mitton (field hockey), Australian field hockey player
Grant Mitton (politician) (born 1941), Canadian radio talk show host and politician
Jack Mitton (1895–1983), English footballer
Jimmy Mitton (1890–1949), English footballer
Lorne Mitton, Canadian politician
Randy Mitton (born 1950), ice hockey linesman
Simon Mitton (born 1946), British astronomer and writer
Trent Mitton (born 1990), Australian field hockey player